Juhan Kivirähk (born 2 July 1957 in Tallinn) is an Estonian sociologist.

Kivirähk is the older brother of writer Andrus Kivirähk. In 1980 he graduated from Tartu State University in economic cybernetics. From 1984 until 1988, he studied at the Estonian Academy of Sciences at the Institute of Socioeconomic Problems.

He is one of the founders of two Estonian poll companies: AS Emor (established in 1990) and OÜ Uuringukeskus Faktum (established in 2002). 1998-2002 he was the vice-director of the poll company Turu-uuringute AS. He has also worked on International Centre for Defence and Security (ICDS).

Awards
 2001: Order of the White Star, V class.

References

Living people
1957 births
Estonian sociologists
Recipients of the Order of the White Star, 5th Class
University of Tartu alumni
People from Tallinn